The 3rd Indonesian Choice Awards (Official name: NET. 3.0 presents Indonesian Choice Awards 2016) was an entertainment industry award ceremony held on 29 May 2016 at the Sentul International Convention Center in Bogor, West Java. The show was hosted by Sarah Sechan, Vincent Rompies and Desta.

Awards were presented in 11 categories. The newest category, "Creative & Innovative Person of the Year," replaced the "Digital Persona of the Year" category from the prior year. The awards ceremony aired live on NET. coinciding with the third anniversary celebration, entitled NET 3.0: #IndonesiaLebihKece.

Nominees for the 3rd Indonesian Choice Awards ceremony were first announced on 27 April 2016 by NET via Twitter. Musician Isyana Sarasvati received the most nominations with three. Isyana Sarasvati and Rizky Febian were the biggest winners of the night, both receiving two awards. Other winners included Tulus, who won "Male Singer of the Year" and GAC, who won "Band/Duo/Group of the Year". 

Musician and songwriter Yovie Widianto received the special "Lifetime Achievement Award" from the Chief of the Creative Economy Agency Triawan Munaf for his consistent dedication to promoting and developing the Indonesian music industry with quality featuring a number of songs about heartbreak and romance.

Voting system
Voting for the 2016 Indonesian Choice Awards opened on May 1, 2016.

Performers
Reference:

Presenters
 Deva Mahenra and Chelsea Islan – Presented Actor of the Year
 Danang & Darto – Presented Actress of the Year
 Tanta Ginting and Sahira Anjani – Presented Movie of the Year
 Abdee Negara – Presented Creative and Innovative Person of the Year
 Lukman Sardi and Gista Putri – Presented TV Program of the Year
 Sule and Andre Taulany – Presented Breakthrough Artist of the Year
 Dwi Sasono and Sophia Latjuba – Presented Group/Band/Duo of the Year
 Ibnu Jamil and Atiqah Hasiholan – Presented Album of the Year
 Temmy Rahadi and Safira Umm – Presented Female Singer of the Year
 Marissa Anita and Zivanna Letisha – Presented Male Singer of the Year
 Triawan Munaf – Presented Lifetime Achievement Award
 Dodit Mulyanto and Hesti Purwadinata – Presented Song of the Year

Winners and nominees
The full list of nominees and winners is as follows:

Music

Movie

Television

Other

Special award

References

2016 music awards
Indonesian Choice Awards